The Canon EOS-3 is a 35mm film single-lens reflex camera for professionals and advanced amateurs built by Canon of Japan.  It was introduced in November 1998,
and was offered as recently as 2007.

The camera is the successor to the EOS-5 but has a lot in common with the canon EOS-1n such as the operation of the camera controls and the environmental sealing, whereas the EOS-5 has none. The common heritage of the EOS-3 and EOS-1 line is also seen in the accessories (such as the motor-drive and battery pack) which are mostly the same or at least interchangeable.

The EOS-3 introduced the 45-point autofocus system later used in the EOS-1v, EOS-1D and subsequent Canon professional SLRs. It was the last camera outside the 1-series, either film or digital, to receive Canon's top-of-the-line AF system until the March 2012 announcement of the EOS 5D Mark III.

The EOS-3 inherited a refined version of the Eye-Control system of the EOS-5. This system, when calibrated to a given user, allowed for picking one of the 45 points of the autofocus system simply by looking at it though the viewfinder. An infrared transmitter and receiver mounted around the eyepiece monitored the position of the iris, thus "knowing" where the photographer was looking and focusing on that point. The system has its limitations however, notably eyeglasses and occasionally contact lenses would confuse the system. This feature was never rolled forward to the later 1V body.

The shutter unit of the EOS-3 passed Canon's standard endurance tests of 100,000 shutter cycles whereas the EOS-1v was specified to withstand at least 150,000 shutter cycles.

The EOS-3 incorporated E-TTL flash metering for use with the EX series of external Canon flash units.

References

External links 
 
 Canon USA EOS-3 Specification Page

3